Amelia is a town and comune of the province of Terni, in the Umbria region of central Italy. It grew up around an ancient hill fort, known to the Romans as Ameria.

Geography
The town lies in the south of Umbria, on a hill overlooking the Tiber River to the east and the Nera River to the west.

History
According to some scholars, Amelia is the oldest town in Umbria. It was supposedly founded by a legendary Umbrian king, King Ameroe, who gave the city the name Ameria. Pliny the Elder is reported as saying that Ameria was founded 963 years before the war with Perseus (171–168 BC), so 1134 BC.  This date cannot be considered accurate.

The city was later occupied by the Etruscans, and later still by the Romans, although it is not mentioned by name in the history of the Roman conquest of Umbria.  Ameria occupied a strategic location in the Second Latin War (340–338 BC), lying on a loop of the Via Cassia called the Via Amerina, which started at Falerii and crossed the Tiber at Castellum Amerinum (probably Orte).

The town gained political status as a self-governing municipium, maybe as early as 338 BC, but certainly by the middle of the 1st century BC. Citizens of the town were members of the tribus Clustumina. Cicero's speech in defence of Sextus Roscius Amerinus (the pro Roscio Amerino) describes Ameria as a flourishing place in 80 BC, with a fertile territory extending to the Tiber. Its fruit is often extolled by Roman writers. Augustus divided its lands among his veterans, but did not plant a colony.

The bishopric of Ameria was founded in the middle of the fourth century.

During the barbaric invasions, the city was besieged and badly damaged by the Goths, but was rebuilt by the time the Lombards descended from the north and asserted control over most of what is now Umbria. The Lombards, in turn, were forced out by the Byzantines, and thereafter, throughout the Middle Ages, and up to the time of Italian unification in 1860, Amelia stayed more or less under the domination of the Roman Catholic Church within the Papal States.

During the period the Lombards remained in control of the Via Flaminia, Amelia was an important stop on a vital alternative route, the so-called Byzantine Way, which connected Rome to the exarchate in Ravenna.

In the Middle Ages, Amelia went through the political convulsions common to other Umbrian cities: struggles that saw it emerge as an independent-minded comune, then as a city under the control of a succession of powerful families, sometimes ecclesiastical, and subject to internecine warfare between Guelphs and Ghibellines.

The campanile of the cathedral was erected in 1050 using fragments of Roman buildings.

Main sights

Amelia is especially known for its walls, parts of which may date to Amelia's earliest days. Large segments of the wall are built in polygonal masonry of carefully jointed blocks of limestone. A thirty-meter segment of this wall collapsed in 2006 and is under repair. The walls were further fortified and enlarged during Roman times and at various times during the Middle Ages. The walls run about 720 meters and are about 3.5 meters thick, and have four main gates: the imposing Porta Romana to the south, the main access to the town; Posterola to the north; Porta Leone to the east; and Porta della Valle to the west.

The Romans left other traces of their occupation, including a complex of ten underground cisterns, built in the first century AD, which collected rainwater to feed the town's water supply. There are also snatches of Roman roads within the city, some of them only recently uncovered. A larger-than-life gilt bronze statue of Germanicus was unearthed just outside the Porta Romana in 1963 and is now the linchpin of a new Archaeological Museum.

Today, old Amelia inside the walls, which is most accessible through the Porta Romana, is a well-preserved medieval city. The upper part also offers a view of the Tiber Valley. The center of the city is the Piazza del Duomo where the cathedral and the thirty-meter-high  (Civic Tower) are located. Amelia Cathedral was built originally in 872, and totally rebuilt in Baroque style after a fire in 1629: its façade is of pink cotto and was completed only in the nineteenth century. The interior has works by Federico Zuccari, Lavinia Fontana, Agostino di Duccio, an organ from 1600, and a Turkish banner captured at Lepanto.

San Francesco- construction of the church was begun in 1287, is in Piazza Vera, with a cloister and a convent, which was added in the fourteenth century, and renovated with some Renaissance influences in the sixteenth. The church is capped with an impressive dome that dates to the eleventh century and was modified in the seventeenth century. There is also a bell tower, rebuilt in 1932, while the Romanesque-Gothic façade was finished between 1401 and 1406. Inside are housed sculptures by Duccio, and some Baroque material from the seventeenth and eighteenth century; the noteworthy Geraldini Chapel is from the fifteenth century.

The church of Sant'Agostino, consecrated in 1288, has a façade that is an example of Romanesque architecture with a Gothic overlay. The Marotti pipe organ was only installed in 1841. The annexed cloister, designed by the Lombard master Martino Tartaglia in 1492, has a portico surmounted by a loggia with small Corinthian columns. The church of S. Pancrazio features a main door that is a decorative tour-de-force. Of note also is the church of the Madonna delle Cinque Fonti. The now deconsecrated church of S. Giovanni Decollato, also called the Ospedaletto, can be viewed outside.

Along via Posterola is S. Magno, a Benedictine monastery for cloistered nuns. Inside its little church is a perfectly restored and utterly unique (none other exists) double keyboard organ from 1680.

Among the non-religious buildings there are palaces built during the fourteenth and fifteenth century by the overlords of the city: Palazzo Farrattini and Palazzo Petrignani. The Teatro Operino is an opera house built in the eighteenth century and features frescos by nineteenth-century artist Domenico Bruschi.

Surrounding area
The hilly countryside around Amelia presents several points of interest. The Convent of the Santissima Annunziata, founded by St. Francis' Friars Minor, has a planetarium. The Cistercians established a convent at Foce, the Sanctuary of the Virgin.

The small fraction of Porchiano del Monte has Medieval walls featuring a number of guard towers, and a small Romanesque church, San Simeone. The church of S. Timoteo, also Romanesque, has fourteenth- and fifteenth-century frescoes.

Fornole is home to the Romanesque church of S. Silvestro, with an interesting fresco cycle showing the saint freeing the town from the grasp of a dragon.

Near the town is the Lago Vecchio ("Old Lake") formed by a dam on a small river, the Rio Grande. Rowing boats can be rented to come around in the shade of alder, poplar and willow trees, looking for sometimes surprised ducks and herons. There is a small park called , a former horse racing track, with a walking — or jogging — path around the track, now used for weekend dances and social gatherings.

Festivals and events
The main festival of Amelia is the Palio dei Colombi, which stretches over two weeks in late July and early August. The central event of this palio is a contest during which riders on horseback representing the city's five medieval neighborhoods (contrade) compete against one another in a game of quintain. The winner fires a bolt from a crossbow, hits the target and releases a caged pigeon.

Education 
In 2009, the Association for Research into Crimes against Art (ARCA) first offered its Postgraduate Certificate Program in Art Crime and Cultural Heritage Protection, which is now held from June to August every year in the historic center of Amelia in collaboration with the city of Amelia.

Twin towns
 Civitavecchia, Italy, since 1995
 Joigny, France, since 2005
 Stylida, Greece, since 2002

References

External links
 
 Amelia sotterranea(Underground Amelia)
 Amelia (Thayer's Gazetteer)
 The Association for Research into Crimes Against Art
 Postgraduate Certificate Program
 Art Crime Conference
 
 Franco Della Rosa
  

Cities and towns in Umbria
Hilltowns in Umbria